Apart from officials and representatives of member countries and observer countries, the Hong Kong Ministerial Conference will be the first to house the centre for the non-governmental organization (NGOs) under the same roof as the conference proper. The NGOs representatives will be approved by registration to attend the Conference.

WTO officials
 Pascal Lamy, Director-General of WTO
 Alejandro Jara, Deputy Director-General of WTO
 Valentine Rugwabiza, Deputy Director-General of WTO
 Harsha Vardhana Singh, Deputy Director-General of WTO
 Rufus Yerxa, Deputy Director-General of WTO]

International officials
 Peter Mandelson, Commissioner of the European Union for Trade Issues
Mariann Fischer Boel, EU Agriculture Commissioner
Margaret Beckett, British Farm Minister
Christine Lagarde, France's Trade Minister

Hong Kong officials
 Donald Tsang (曾蔭權), Chief Executive
 John Tsang (曾俊華), Secretary for Commerce, Industry and Technology
 Ambrose Lee (李少光), Secretary for Security
 Raymond Young (楊立門), Director-General of Trade and Industry
 Dick Lee (李明逵), Commissioner of Police
 Anthony Lam (林振敏), Director of Fire Services

NGO leaders
The General Council has further clarified the framework for relations with the NGOs by adopting a set of guidelines on 18 July 1996, which "recognizes the role NGOs can play to increase the awareness of the public in respect of WTO activities". On 26 May 2005, the General Council agreed on approving the attendance of Non-Governmental Organizations at the Sixth Session of the Ministerial Conference under the following registration procedures:
 NGOs would be allowed to attend only the Plenary Sessions of the Conference (without the right to speak);
 Applications from NGOs to be registered would be accepted on the basis of Article V, paragraph 2 of the WTO Agreement, i.e. NGOs "concerned with matters related to those of the WTO"; and
 The registration of NGOs that wish to attend the Conference should be made on or before m29 July 2005.

NGOs Eligible for the conference:

International NGO leaders
Anil Singh, NEED India
CUTS International
Greenpeace International
Asian Regional Exchange for New Alternatives

Hong Kong NGO leaders
 Elizabeth Tang (鄧燕娥), Chairperson of Hong Kong People's Alliance on WTO
 Lau Chin Shek (劉千石), President of Hong Kong Confederation of Trade Unions
 Lee Cheuk Yan (李卓仁), General Secretary of Hong Kong Confederation of Trade Unions
 Albert Lai (黎廣德), Chairman of the Hong Kong People's Council for Sustainable Development
 Dolores Ballabares, Chairperson of the United Filipinos in Hong Kong
 Tse Kam Keung (謝錦強), Chairperson of Oxfam Hong Kong Council
 Emily Chan (陳英凝), President of Médecins Sans Frontières (MSF) Hong Kong
Global Network (全球聯陣──勞工基層大聯盟)

WTO members
Developing countries make up about three quarters of the total WTO membership. Together with countries currently in the process of "transition" to market-based economies, they play an increasingly important role in the WTO.
Albania
Antigua and Barbuda
Argentina - Alberto Fernández, President
Armenia
Australia - Scott Morrison, Prime Minister
Austria
Bahrain - Khalifa bin Salman Al Khalifa, Prime Minister
Barbados
Belgium
Belize
Bolivarian Republic of Venezuela
Bolivia
Botswana
Brazil - Jair Bolsonaro, President
Brunei Darussalam - Hassanal Bolkiah, Sultan
Bulgaria
Cameroon
Canada - Justin Trudeau, Prime Minister
Chile - Sebastian Piñera, President
China - Li Keqiang, Premier
Colombia
Congo
Costa Rica
Côte d'Ivoire
Croatia
Cuba
Cyprus
Czech Republic
Denmark
Dominica
Dominican Republic
Ecuador
Egypt
El Salvador
Estonia
European Communities
Fiji
Finland
France - Emmanuel Macron, President
Gabon
Georgia
Germany - Angela Merkel, Chancellor
Ghana
Greece - Kyriakos Mitsotakis, Prime Minister
Grenada
Guatemala
Guyana
Honduras
Hong Kong, China
Hungary
Iceland
India - Narendra Modi, Prime Minister
Indonesia - Joko Widodo, President
Ireland
Israel
Italy - Giuseppe Conte, Prime Minister
Jamaica
Japan - Shinzō Abe, Prime Minister
Jordan
Kenya
Kuwait
Kyrgyz Republic
Laos - Thongloun Sisoulith, Prime Minister
Latvia
Liechtenstein
Lithuania
Luxembourg
Macedonia, provisionally referred to by the WTO as the "former Yugoslav Republic of Macedonia"
Macao, China
Malaysia - Mahathir Mohamad, Prime Minister
Malta
Mauritius
Mexico - Andrés Manuel López Obrador, President
Moldova
Mongolia
Morocco
Namibia
Netherlands - Jan Peter Balkenende, Prime Minister
New Zealand - Jacinda Ardern, Prime Minister
Nicaragua
Nigeria
Norway
Oman
Pakistan - Imran Khan, Prime Minister
Panama
Papua New Guinea - James Marape, Prime Minister
Paraguay
Peru - Martín Vizcarra, President
Philippines - Rodrigo Duterte, President
Poland
Portugal
Qatar
Romania
Russia - Mikhail Mishustin, Prime Minister
Saint Kitts and Nevis
Saint Lucia
Saint Vincent and the Grenadines
Saudi Arabia - Mohammad bin Salman, Crown Prince
Singapore - Lee Hsien Loong, Prime Minister
Slovak Republic
Slovenia
South Africa - Cyril Ramaphosa, President
South Korea - Moon Jae-in, President
Spain - Pedro Sánchez, Prime Minister
Sri Lanka - Gotabaya Rajapaksa, President
Suriname
Swaziland
Sweden
Switzerland - Ulrich Maurer, President
Chinese Taipei
Thailand - Prayut Chan-o-cha, Prime Minister
Trinidad and Tobago
Tunisia
Turkey - Recep Tayyip Erdoğan, President
Ukraine - Volodymyr Zelenskyy, President
United Arab Emirates - Mohammed bin Rashid Al Maktoum, Prime Minister
United Kingdom - Boris Johnson, Prime Minister
United States - Donald Trump, President
Uruguay
Vietnam - Nguyễn Xuân Phúc, Prime Minister
Zimbabwe

The Least-Developed Countries(LDCs)
The WTO regards the least-developed countries (LDCs)as countries which have been designated as such by the United Nations. There are currently 50 the least-developed countries on the UN list, 32 of which to date have become WTO members.

These are:
Angola
Bangladesh - Sheikh Hasina, Prime Minister
Benin
Burkina Faso
Burundi
Cambodia - Hun Sen, Prime Minister
Central African Republic
Chad
Congo, Democratic Republic of the
Djibouti
Gambia
Guinea
Guinea Bissau
Haiti
Lesotho
Madagascar
Malawi
Maldives
Mali
Mauritania
Mozambique
Myanmar - Aung San Suu Kyi, State Counselor
Nepal
Niger
Rwanda
Senegal
Sierra Leone
Solomon Islands
Tanzania
Togo
Uganda
Vietnam
Zambia

There are no WTO definitions of "developed" or "developing" countries. Developing countries in the WTO are designated on the basis of self-selection although this is not necessarily automatically accepted in all WTO bodies.

Observer governments
With the exception of the Holy See, observers must start accession negotiations within five years of becoming observers.
Afghanistan
Algeria
Andorra
Azerbaijan
Bahamas
Belarus
Bhutan
Bosnia and Herzegovina
Cape Verde
Ethiopia
Holy See (Vatican)
Iran
Iraq
Kazakhstan
Lao People's Democratic Republic
Lebanese Republic
Libya
Montenegro
Russian Federation
Samoa
Serbia
Seychelles
Sudan
Tajikistan
Tonga
Ukraine
Uzbekistan
Vanuatu
Yemen

The Least-Developed Countries
Equatorial Guinea
São Tomé and Príncipe

External links
The Hong Kong People's Council for Sustainable Development
Medecins Sans Frontiers (MSF) Hong Kong

World Trade Organization
2005 Conference
World Trade Organization Ministerial Conference of 2005